Max Lugavere (born 1982 in New York City) is an American television personality, health and wellness writer and low-carbohydrate diet advocate. He resides in Los Angeles, California and New York City.

Early life and education 

Lugavere was born and raised in Manhattan, New York City to parents of Jewish descent. Lugavere graduated with a degree in film and psychology from the University of Miami in Coral Gables, Florida.

Career 
From 2005 to 2011, Lugavere was a presenter on Current TV, an independent cable network. He co-hosted the show Max and Jason: Still Up with Jason Silva, where they featured a wide range of current events and stories ranging from illegal immigration to counterfeit IDs.

In 2013, Lugavere created, produced, and hosted Tribeca Enterprises' first-ever original series, Acting Disruptive, airing across the AOL universe (AolOn, Huffington Post, TechCrunch, etc.). The series covered disruptive ideas and innovation, while featuring prominent entertainer-entrepreneurs.

In January 2015, Lugavere launched a Kickstarter campaign for a documentary film called Bread Head. The project was to explore "the impact of our diets and lifestyles on brain health" as a means towards dementia prevention. As of 2020, the film remains unreleased, having raised over $130,000 of pledges. 

Lugavere has contributed to The Huffington Post, The Daily Beast, Fast Company, and Munchies on topics of science, innovation, and technology. He has also appeared as a guest on The Point, The Rubin Report, The Joe Rogan Experience, and The Dr. Oz Show.

Genius Foods 

Lugavere promotes a low-carbohydrate diet of grass-fed beef, free-range chicken and pasture-raised or omega-3 enriched eggs with low-carbohydrate fibrous vegetables, extra virgin olive oil and salt. In May 2018, Lugavere and Paul Grewal co-authored the book Genius Foods which discusses the link between diet and brain health.

In 2018, Jonathan Jarry of McGill University's Office for Science and Society analysed Lugavere's health-related claims in his book, Genius Foods, and podcast, and concluded that Lugavere lacked the credentials to accurately interpret the scientific literature used to substantiate his health claims, and acknowledged Lugavere's business ambitions. Jarry noted that "Lugavere appears like a proponent of common-sense solutions to ill health—better nutrition, exercise and sleep—but it’s only when you start to trust him that he reveals himself to be a naive believer in anything that has a study behind it. His book has received endorsements from people like Dr. Oz and functional medicine proponent Mark Hyman, and this company is telling."

Criticism of veganism

Lugavere has criticized plant-based and vegan diets for increasing risk of dementia and mental health problems. He has argued that eggs have been "unfairly demonised" by governments, despite containing choline which he says has been linked to lower dementia risk. Lugavere also recommends regular consumption of red meat for mental health.

Selected publications

Genius Foods: Become Smarter, Happier, and More Productive While Protecting Your Brain for Life (HarperWave, 2018)

References

External links 
Official website

1982 births
American food writers
American health and wellness writers
American people of Jewish descent
Critics of veganism
Current TV people
Film directors from New York (state)
HuffPost writers and columnists
Living people
Low-carbohydrate diet advocates
People from New York City
Pseudoscientific diet advocates
University of Miami alumni